Business interaction networks are networks that allow businesses and their communities of interest to collaborate and do business online securely via the Internet. 

Mary Johnston Turner first discussed the concept in a Network World opinion piece in August 1995 and attributed the first advocacy for the concept to the now-defunct BBN Planet, the ISP division of BBN Technologies.

References

Business
Networks